The 2008 Big Ten softball tournament was held at Sharon J. Drysdale Field on the campus of Northwestern University in Evanston, Illinois from May 8 through May 10, 2008. As the tournament winner, Northwestern earned the Big Ten Conference's automatic bid to the 2008 NCAA Division I softball tournament.

Format and seeding
The 2008 tournament was an eight team single-elimination tournament. The top eight teams based on conference regular season winning percentage earned invites to the tournament. After all tiebreakers between Michigan and Northwestern came out equal, the Wildcats won the official coin flip which was conducted by Big Ten Conference officials to determine this year's host. This was the first time in the tournament's history that the top-seeded team was decided by a coin flip.

Bracket

Schedule

All-Tournament Team
 Michelle Batts (Northwestern)
 Jessica Bracamonte (Michigan State)
 Katie Brown (Iowa)
 Lindsay Digmann (Iowa)
 Lauren Delaney (Northwestern)
 Erin Dyer (Northwestern)
 Colleen McGlaughlin (Iowa)
 Quinn Morelock (Iowa)
 Natalie Neal (Minnesota)
 Kelly Quinn (Northwestern)
 Brianna Sudenga (Minnesota)
 Kara Weigle (Michigan State)

Tournament MVP
 Lauren Delaney (Northwestern)

References

Big Ten softball tournament
Tournament